Maulana Abdul Malek Halim is a prominent Islamic scholar of Bangladesh and Nayeb-e Ameer of Hefazat-e-Islam Bangladesh. Abdul Malek Halim is the pioneer of Qawmi Mohila (Female) Madrasa in Bangladesh and the founder of Al-Jamiatul Arabia Lil Baneena Wal Banaat Haildhar, the first Qawmi Madrasa having female branch. At present, Abdul Malek Halim is serving as the principle of the Madrasa. Abdul Malek Halim is also serving as the senior vice-chairman of Islami Oikya Jote. He is an ex-chairman of Nizam-e-Islam Party.

Education
Abdul Malek Halim pursued higher education from Al-Jamiah Al-Islamiah Patiya.

Career
Maulana Malek started his career as a teacher at a local madrasa after completing education. Later he went to Saudi Arabia and worked as an Imam at a Masjid there. He became inspired by observing the religious training provided to the woman in KSA and other Arab countries and decided to establish an Islamic school for woman. His vision was materialized when an Imam of the Kaaba visits his village and inspired him to settle in his country for establishing a female religious school. Finally, Maulana Halim stablished Al-Jamiatul Arabia Lil Baneena Wal Banaat Haildhar in 1972 and serving as the DG of the institution.

See also 
 Shah Ahmad Shafi
 Mufti-e-Azam Allama Faizullah
 Faqihul Millat Mufti Abdur Rahman
 Mufti Mizanur Rahman Sayed
 Fazlul Hoque Amini
 Junaid Babunagari

References

External links 
 Bangladesh Qawmi Madrasah Education Board
 Official Website of Darul Uloom Muinul Islam Hathazari
 A Presentation by the leaders of Hefazot-e-Islam Bangladesh

Living people
Deobandis
People from Banshkhali Upazila
Year of birth missing (living people)
Bangladeshi Sunni Muslim scholars of Islam
Bengali Muslim scholars of Islam
21st-century Bengalis
21st-century Muslim scholars of Islam
21st-century Muslim theologians